The Meiningen Court Orchestra is one of the oldest and most traditional orchestras in Europe. Since 1952 the now 68-member orchestra has been affiliated to the Meiningen Court Theatre and in addition to their opera performances regularly give symphony concerts and youth concerts. The incumbent music director (GMD) is Philippe Bach.

History
The Saxe-Meiningen ducal court orchestra was founded in 1690 by Duke Bernhard I. The rise of the initially small ensemble began under the direction of the Baroque composer Georg Caspar Schürmann from 1702 to 1707. From 1711 until 1731 Johann Ludwig Bach, a second cousin of Johann Sebastian Bach, served as conductor, succeeded by his relatives Gottlieb Friedrich and Johann Philipp Bach.

In 1867 the Court Orchestra under principal conductor Emil Blücher together with Franz Liszt held a festival of the Allgemeiner Deutscher Musikverein (General German Music Association) promoting contemporary composers like Leopold Damrosch, Eduard Lassen, Felix Draeseke, and Robert Volkmann. At Richard Wagner's request, the orchestra performed at the first Bayreuth Festival in 1876.

With the succession of Hans von Bülow as court music director in October 1880, the most successful period of the chapel began, when it developed into an elite European orchestra. Bülow brought Johannes Brahms to Meiningen to cooperate with the Court Orchestra and to occasionally conduct. In a letter to the "theatre duke" George II of Saxe-Meiningen, Brahms wrote "Bülow must know that the smallest rehearsal in the smallest Meiningen hall is more important to me than any Paris or London concert, and ...how good and comfortable I feel amidst the orchestra, I could sing aloud a long song of praise about it..." His Symphony No. 4 premiered in Meiningen on 25 October 1885 with the composer himself conducting. While Bülow was offered the conducting of the Berlin Philharmonic Orchestra, young Richard Strauss from 1885 temporarily worked as music director in Meiningen, succeeded by Fritz Steinbach and Wilhelm Berger.

Timeline of musical directors

(1690–1702) Bernhard I of Saxe-Meiningen
(1702–1707) Georg Caspar Schürmann
(1711–1731) Johann Ludwig Bach
(1865–1880) Emil Büchner
(1880–1885) Hans von Bülow
(1885–1886) Richard Strauss
(1886–1903) Fritz Steinbach
(1903–1911) Wilhelm Berger
(1911–1914) Max Reger
(1915–1920) Karl Piening
(1926–1930) Heinz Bongartz
(1945–?) Peter Schmitz
(1956–1961) Rolf Reuter
(1961–1967) Olaf Koch
(1967–1995) Wolfgang Hocke
(1995–1999) Marie-Jeanne Dufour
(1999–2004) Kirill Petrenko
(2004-2007) Alan Buribayev
(2007–2010) Hans Urbanek
(2010–Present) Philippe Bach

World premiere of works
Brahms – Symphony No. 4 in E minor, Op. 98 (October 25, 1885)
Strauss – Suite in Bb major (suite for wind) Op. 4 (November 18, 1884)

Notable instrumentalists
Richard Mühlfeld – Violinist (1873–1876), Principal clarinettist (1876–?)
Gustave Knoop – Cellist
Justus Johann Friedrich Dotzauer – Cellist (1801–1805)
Richard Bruno Heydrich – Contrabassist

Culture in Meiningen
German symphony orchestras
1690 establishments in the Holy Roman Empire
Musical groups established in the 17th century